The Charlottesville Tom Sox are a collegiate summer baseball team in Charlottesville, Virginia. They play in the southern division of the Valley Baseball League.

The Tom Sox are the 2017 & 2019 Valley Baseball League Champions.

The team plays its home games at Charlottesville High School.

Mission 
The Tom Sox were founded in 2014 and began play in the summer of 2015, marking the first time since 1974 Charlottesville had a team in the Valley Baseball League. The given mission of the team is to "promote the game of baseball in Central Virginia by providing a high quality collegiate summer team, a memorable fan experience, and opportunities for youth to grow in the game and in character."

Head coaches 
 Mike Goldberg (2015)
 Travis Thomas (2016)
 Corey Hunt (2017–2019)
Kory Koehler (2020-21)
Ramon Garza (2022-present)

Notable players 
 Christian Lowry and Jack Roberts of the Tom Sox's 2015 team, as well as Justin Novak from their 2016 team, won the College World Series with the University of Virginia in 2015. 
 Billy Cooke of the Tom Sox's 2015 team won the College World Series with Coastal Carolina in 2016. Cooke was also the first Tom Sox player to be drafted in the MLB Draft, being drafted by the Seattle Mariners in the 8th round of the 2017 MLB June Amateur Draft.
 Cole Maye and Keenan Bell of the Tom Sox's 2017 team and Kirby McMullen of the Tom Sox's 2018 & 2019 teams won the College World Series with the University of Florida in 2017.
 Wooster's Michael Wielansky, the 2017 Valley Baseball League MVP, was drafted by the Houston Astros in the 18th round of the 2018 MLB Draft. Also drafted from the Tom Sox in 2018 were Coastal Carolina standout Seth Lancaster (2015) and Richmond closer Layne Looney (2017).

References

External links 
 Charlottesville Tom Sox Website
 Charlottesville Tom Sox Roster 
 Charlottesville Tom Sox Coaching Staff 
 Valley Baseball League

Amateur baseball teams in Virginia
Valley Baseball League teams
Charlottesville, Virginia
2014 establishments in Virginia
Baseball teams established in 2014